Baldpate is a  offshore compliant tower oil platform near the coast of Louisiana, owned and operated by Hess Corporation. It was the first freestanding compliant tower to be built following the Lena platform which was a guyed compliant tower.  It is the second tallest structure built in water after the Petronius (oil platform). The Baldpate Platform was designed and built by Hudson Engineering (now J. Ray McDermott Engineering) in Houston, Texas, and installed by Heerema Marine Contractors.

Compliant towers are designed to be more flexible than traditional fixed truss towers such as the Bullwinkle (oil platform). Baldpate in particular is designed to move up to 10 feet laterally during severe storm conditions.

The complaint tower section jacket section was fabricated by Aker Gulf Marine, weights a total of 28,900 tons, far below the original estimate of 50,000 tones. The platform was built in multiple sections which were assembled together later when the structure arrived at its final location.  The lower 107 m (351 ft) tall base section weights 8,700 tons, this section has a wider base 140 feet squared that reduces to 90 feet squared at its top. The main legs of the structure have a diameter of 12 feet at their widest with a steel thickness of 3.5 inches. At the corner of each side the structure is supported by steel piles which reach a depth of 430 feet. The upper 402 m (1320 ft) tall tower section weights 20,200 tons. This section has a length and width of 90 feet across which remains constant from the bottom to the top of the frame. The main legs in this section have a diameter of 10.67 feet with a steel thickness of 3.3 inches. The total combined height of the jacket/truss tower section of Baldpate is 1,671 feet, 1,647 feet of which is under water. The topside weights an additional 9,800 tons giving the structure a total weight of 38,700 tons.

See also
 List of tallest oil platforms
 List of tallest freestanding steel structures
 Offshore oil and gas in the US Gulf of Mexico

References

External links
 Diagram at Skyscraper.com
 HMC World Records

Oil platforms off the United States
Petroleum industry in the Gulf of Mexico
Energy infrastructure in Louisiana